Carnot is an unincorporated community located in the town of Forestville in southern Door County, Wisconsin, U.S.A. The community contains a church, cemetery and some scattered residences.

References

Unincorporated communities in Wisconsin
Unincorporated communities in Door County, Wisconsin